The American Society of Composers, Authors, and Publishers (ASCAP) is an American not-for-profit performance-rights organization (PRO) that collectively licenses the public performance rights of its members' musical works to venues, broadcasters, and digital streaming services (music stores).

ASCAP collects licensing fees from users of music created by ASCAP members, then distributes them back to its members as royalties. In effect, the arrangement is the product of a compromise: when a song is played, the user does not have to pay the copyright holder directly, nor does the music creator have to bill a radio station for use of a song.

In 2021, ASCAP collected over US$1.335 billion in revenue and distributed $1.254 billion in royalties to its members. ASCAP membership included over 850,000 songwriters, composers and music publishers, with over 16 million registered works.

History

ASCAP was founded by Victor Herbert, together with composers George Botsford, Silvio Hein, Irving Berlin, Louis Hirsch, John Raymond Hubbell and Gustave Kerker, Millard Fillmore, lyricist Glen MacDonough, publishers George Maxwell (who served as its first president) and Jay Witmark and copyright attorney Nathan Burkan at the Hotel Claridge in New York City on February 13, 1914, to protect the copyrighted musical compositions of its members, who were mostly writers and publishers associated with New York City's Tin Pan Alley. ASCAP's earliest members included the era's most active songwriters—George M. Cohan, Rudolf Friml, Otto Harbach, Jerome Kern, John Philip Sousa, Alfred Baldwin Sloane, James Weldon Johnson, Robert Hood Bowers and Harry Tierney. Subsequently, many other prominent songwriters became members. Composers who could not read and write musical notation were ineligible for membership. This requirement, since dropped, excluded many songwriters in such genres as country. However, an exception was made to admit Irving Berlin.

In 1919, ASCAP and the Performing Rights Society of Great Britain (since 1997 known as PRS for Music), signed the first reciprocal agreement for the representation of each other's members' works in their respective territories. Today, ASCAP has global reciprocal agreements and licenses the U.S. performances of hundreds of thousands of international music creators.

The advent of radio in the 1920s brought an important new source of income for ASCAP. Radio stations originally only broadcast performers live, the performers working for free. Later, performers wanted to be paid, and recorded performances became more prevalent. ASCAP started collecting license fees from the broadcasters. Between 1931 and 1939, ASCAP increased royalty rates charged to broadcasters more than 400%.

Boycott

In 1940, when ASCAP tried to double its license fees again, radio broadcasters formed a boycott of ASCAP and founded a competing royalty agency, Broadcast Music Incorporated (BMI). During a ten-month period lasting from January 1 to October 29, 1941, no music licensed by ASCAP (1,250,000 songs) was broadcast on NBC and CBS radio stations. Instead, the stations played regional music and styles (like rhythm and blues or country) that had been rejected by ASCAP. Upon the conclusion of litigation between broadcasters and ASCAP in October 1941, ASCAP settled for a lower fee than they had initially demanded.

Consent decree
In the late 1930s, ASCAP's general control over most music and its membership requirements were considered to be in restraint of trade and illegal under the Sherman Anti-Trust Act. The Justice Department sued ASCAP in 1937 but abandoned the case. The Justice Department sued again in 1941, and the case was settled with a consent decree in which the most important points were that ASCAP must fairly set rates and not discriminate between customers who have basically the same requirements to license music, or "similar standing." Also, anyone who is unable to negotiate satisfactory terms with ASCAP, or is otherwise unable to get a license, may go to the court in the Southern District of New York overseeing the consent decree and litigate the terms they find objectionable, and the terms set by the court will be binding upon the licensee and ASCAP. BMI also signed a consent decree in 1941.

Membership expands
ASCAP's membership diversified further in the 1940s, bringing along jazz and swing greats, including Duke Ellington, Count Basie, Benny Goodman, and Fletcher Henderson. The movies also soared in popularity during the 1930s and 1940s, and with them came classic scores and songs by new ASCAP members like Harold Arlen, Johnny Mercer, Cole Porter, Morton Gould, and Jule Styne. Classical-music composers Aaron Copland, Igor Stravinsky, Florence Price, and Leonard Bernstein brought their compositions into the ASCAP repertory in the 1940s. In the 1940s, it was common for ASCAP and BMI to send out field representatives to sign new songwriters and music publishing companies, as the firms were not household names; one such ASCAP employee was Loring Buzzell, who later formed the music publishing company Hecht-Lancaster & Buzzell Music.

The rise of rock and roll derived from both country music and rhythm and blues music caused airplay of BMI licensed songs to double that of ASCAP licensed songs. ASCAP officials decided that the practice of payola was the reason. So ASCAP spearheaded a congressional investigation into the practice of payola in 1959.

In the 1950s and 1960s, television was introduced as a new revenue stream for ASCAP, one that maintains its importance today. With the birth of FM radio, new ASCAP members, including John Denver, Jimi Hendrix, Quincy Jones, Janis Joplin, and Carly Simon scored massive hits. Many Motown hits were written by ASCAP members Ashford & Simpson, Marvin Gaye, Smokey Robinson, and Stevie Wonder. Both The Beatles and The Rolling Stones licensed their works through ASCAP, and the very first country Grammy Award went to ASCAP writer Bobby Russell for "Little Green Apples". During this period, ASCAP also initiated a series of lawsuits to recover the position they lost during the boycott of 1941, without success.

The early 1960s folk music revival, led by ASCAP member Bob Dylan (later switched to SESAC) made ASCAP a major player in that genre.  Dylan's expansion into rock music later that decade gave ASCAP a foothold in that genre. At the same time, ASCAP member Shapiro, Bernstein & Co. started having country hits for ASCAP.

By 1970, a new generation of ASCAP board members decided to launch a campaign to attract more songwriters and music publishers away from BMI. The campaign led to Motown Records switching most of its music publishing from BMI to ASCAP in 1971.

During the last three decades of the 20th century, ASCAP's membership grew to reflect every new development in music, including the funk, punk rock, heavy metal, hip-hop, techno, and grunge music genres. Creators ranging from Lauryn Hill and Dr. Dre to the Ramones, Slayer, and John Zorn joined. ASCAP launched a Latin membership department to serve ASCAP Latin writers—Marc Anthony, Joan Sebastian, and Olga Tañon among them–with the Spanish-speaking world as their audience. In 1981, ASCAP prevailed against CBS in an eleven-year-old court case challenging the ASCAP blanket license.

ASCAP licenses over 11,500 local commercial radio stations, more than 2500 non-commercial radio broadcasters and hundreds of thousands of "general" licensees (bars, restaurants, theme parks, etc.). It maintains reciprocal relationships with nearly 40 foreign PROs across six continents, and licenses billions of public performances worldwide each year. ASCAP was the first U.S. PRO to distribute royalties for performances on the Internet and continues to pursue and secure licenses for websites, digital music providers and other new media.

Awards
ASCAP honors its top members in a series of annual awards shows in seven different music categories: pop, rhythm and soul, film and television, Latin, country, Christian, and concert music. Awards are presented through a "vote online" that makes up 50% of the judging criteria. The other 50% came from different music critics where in addition, ASCAP inducts jazz greats to its Jazz Wall of Fame in an annual ceremony held at ASCAP's New York City offices and honors PRS members that license their works through ASCAP at an annual awards gala in London, England. ASCAP also gives annually the special accolades Vanguard Award, Songwriter of the Year, and Publisher of the Year.

In 1979, to honor composers of concert music (Classical) in the early stages of their careers, ASCAP created The ASCAP Foundation Young Composer Awards which, upon the death of ASCAP President Morton Gould in 1996, were renamed the ASCAP Foundation Morton Gould Young Composer Awards to honor Gould's lifelong commitment to encouraging young creators as well as his own early development as a composer.

Beginning in 1986, ASCAP created the Golden Soundtrack Award to honor composers for "outstanding achievements and contributions to the world of film and television music." In 1996, it was renamed the Henry Mancini Award to pay tribute to the late composer's history of achievements in the field.

ASCAP also bestows the near-annual Deems Taylor Awards to writers and music journalists. Named after the first president of ASCAP, Deems Taylor, they were established in 1967 to honor his memory. The Deems Taylor Award "recognizes books, articles, broadcasts and websites on the subject of music selected for their excellence."

Criticism
ASCAP attracted media attention in 1996 when it threatened Girl Scouts of the USA and Boy Scouts of America camps that sang ASCAP's copyrighted works at camps with lawsuits for not paying licensing fees. These threats were later retracted. However, it has drawn negative attention for cracking down on licensing fees on other occasions as well, such as when it demanded that open mic events need to pay licensing (even if most or all of the songs are original).

ASCAP has also been criticized for its extremely non-transparent operations, including the refusal to release attendance records for board members, the notes from board meetings, and the reasoning behind their weighting formulas which determine how much money a song or composition earns for use on television or radio.

In 2009, an ASCAP rate court case regarding ringtones generated considerable public attention. Critics claimed that ASCAP may seek to hold consumers responsible for a ringtone public performance. In statements to the press, ASCAP noted the following:

It is seeking to ensure that wireless carriers pay ASCAP members a share of the substantial revenue that mobile operators derive from content (like ringtones) that uses ASCAP members' music. This content includes the delivery of full track songs, music videos, television content, ringtones and ringback tones.
It has been licensing wireless carriers and ringtone content providers since 2001, and that it is not in any way seeking to charge consumers.
It is striving to license those that make a business of transmitting its members' music. This holds true for any medium where businesses have been built by using this music as content or a service – whether terrestrial broadcast, satellite, cable, Internet or wireless carriers providing audio and video content.

On October 14, 2009, a federal court ruled that "when a ringtone plays on a cellular telephone, even when that occurs in public, the user is exempt from copyright liability, and [the cellular carrier] is not liable either secondarily or directly." The ruling made clear that playing music in public, when done without any commercial purpose, does not infringe copyright. (US v. ASCAP, US District Court, Southern District of New York).

Further controversies arose involving ASCAP in 2009 and 2010. The organization requested that some websites pay licensing fees on embedded YouTube videos, even though YouTube already pays licensing fees, and demanded payment from Amazon.com and iTunes for 30-second streaming previews of music tracks, which traditionally does not require a license, being considered a promotional vehicle for song sales.

In 2009, Mike Masnik, the founder and CEO of Floor64, accused ASCAP of keeping some royalties instead of passing them on to artists. He claimed ASCAP collects royalties from all sizes of live performance on behalf of all the artists it represents but passes on the royalties only to artists whose music is represented in one of "the top 200 grossing US tours of the year." This is true in accordance with ASCAP's membership agreement, which states that top performing writers and publishers receive, “bonus incentives,” which are taken from the untraceable revenue brought in by bars, nightclubs, and similarly situated venues.

In June 2010, ASCAP sent letters to its members soliciting donations to fight entities that support weaker copyright restrictions, such as Public Knowledge, the Electronic Frontier Foundation, and Creative Commons, creating notable controversy as many argued that these licenses are a form of copyright and offer the artist an extra choice. Lawrence Lessig, a co-founder of Creative Commons, responded stating that they are not aiming to undermine copyright, and invited ASCAP for a public debate. The offer was turned down by ASCAP's Paul Williams.

It was reported in April 2020, that songwriters and composers were facing delays in receiving royalties. This was delivered via a memo to hundreds of thousands of members from CEO Elizabeth Matthews, who cited the global disruption of the COVID-19 pandemic was to blame. This raised contention as those critical of the announcement wondered why the pandemic at that time would affect payments related to the third quarter of 2019. Further, it was revealed that publishers were still being paid royalties on time.

See also
BMI
Copyright collective
United States v. ASCAP
PRS for Music, a British music copyright collective

References

Bibliography
 ASCAP (1948) The ASCAP Biographical Dictionary, 1st ed., 483 p. ("1,890 writers, 309 publishers: 1,887 biographies") .
 ASCAP (1952) The ASCAP Biographical Dictionary, 2nd ed., 636 p. ("2,297 writers (including 203 women), 453 publishers: ? biographies") LC: 52-7038 .
 ASCAP (1966) The ASCAP Biographical Dictionary, 3rd ed., 845 p. ("8,500 writers, 2,800 publishers: 5,238 biographies') LC: 66-20214 .
 ASCAP (1980) The ASCAP Biographical Dictionary, 4th ed., 589 p. ("? writers, 7,000 publishers: 8,200 biographies") LC: 80–65351,  .

Further reading
Blume, Jason (2006).  This Business of Songwriting. Billboard Books (New York City).  .
Choquette, Frederic, "The Returned Value of PROs", Music Business Journal, Berklee College of Music, May 2011
Passman, Donald S. (2003).  All You Need to Know about the Music Business. Free Press (New York City).  .
Shemel, Sidney; Krasilovsky, M. William (1990).  This Business of Music. Billboard Books (New York City). .

External links

ASCAP archives, 1914-1986 – Music Division, The New York Public Library

Music licensing organizations
Non-profit organizations based in New York City
Organizations based in New York City
Organizations established in 1914